José María Maza Sancho (born 1948) is a Chilean astronomer and astrophysicist. His work has focused on the study of supernovas, the execution of a search for objects with emission lines, dark energy, and quasars with an objective prism, which led him to be awarded the National Prize for Exact Sciences in 1999. Since 2017 he gained popular following with books aimed to the general public and podcasts.

Biography
After studying at the Internado Nacional Barros Arana, he entered the University of Chile as an astronomy student. He did his doctoral studies in astronomy at the University of Toronto.

Since 1968 he has been an academic of the Faculty of Physical and Mathematical Sciences of the University of Chile, and since 1987 he has been a full professor of that house of studies. He was director of the University of Chile's Department of Astronomy from 1997 to 2000.

Between 1979 and 1984 he headed the Scientific Project of Search for Supernovas at Cerro El Roble and was part of Project Calán Tololo, a Chilean-American initiative that featured the joint work of the University of Chile with the Cerro Tololo Interamerican Observatory, in the search for supernovas.

The Calán Tololo project gave contemporary astrophysics tools for measuring the universe more precisely, calculations that years later would be key for a group of American astronomers to follow these supernova studies, being part of the theory of accelerating expansion of the universe by dark energy. He has not been recognized as such since all his mathematical calculations were provided to Harvard University on the condition that they would only perform a mathematical modeling, which allowed that group of American scientists to win the Nobel Prize in 2011.

The astronomer Rafael Ferrando baptized the asteroid 108113 as "Maza", in honor of José Maza Sancho.

Awards
 Presidential Chair in Sciences, 1995
 Rector's Medal, University of Chile, 1996
 National Prize for Exact Sciences, 1999
 Rector's Medal, University of Chile, 1999
 Active Member of the Academy of Sciences since 2002

Published books
 Supernovas, Ediciones B, 2008. Coauthored with Mario Hamuy Wackenhut. 
 Astronomía contemporánea, Ediciones B, 2009. 
 Somos polvo de estrellas, Editorial Planeta, 2017. 
Marte: la próxima frontera, Editorial Planeta, Santiago, 2018.

References

1948 births
Chilean astrophysicists
Living people
People from Valparaíso
University of Chile alumni
University of Toronto alumni